Fourth Association of Model Auto Racing, otherwise known as FAMAR is the governing body of radio-controlled car racing in South Africa, Mexico, Central and South America. It is one of the four member blocs to be entitled full voting right within IFMAR.

Member countries
Argentina (Asociación Argentina de Pilotos de Autos a Radiocontrol de Todo Tipo - AAPARTT)
Bolivia (FEBOLARC)
Brazil (Federação Brasileira de Automodelismo Rádio Controlado - FEBARC)
Chile (APARC)
Colombia (ACA)
Costa Rica (ACAP)
Curaçao (CRCCDA)
Ecuador (CADE)
Israel (RCZone)
Mexico (FEMARAC)
Peru (APERCAR)
Dominican Republic (Asociación Dominicana de Radio Control - ADORC)
South Africa (South African Radio Driver's Association - SARDA)
Trinidad and Tobago (RCMOTT)
Uruguay (AUDARO)
Venezuela (Asociación de Off Road Radio Control Venezuela - ORRCV)

FAMAR Championships Winners

Southamerican Championships Winners

References

Radio-controlled car racing organizations
Hobbyist organizations
Sports governing bodies in South America
Sports governing bodies in Africa